Beneath is the third studio album by the American screamo band Infant Island. It was released on May 15, 2020, through Dog Knights Productions. It was produced by Matthew Michel of Majority Rule at his studio in Dunn Loring, Virginia. The album features a guest vocal performance from Logan Rivera of Gillian Carter. "Death Portrait" is a re-recording of a song which originally appeared on the band's 4-way split Hymnes aux Désarrois de la Peau.

The album was critically acclaimed at the time of its release, and was named one of the best albums of the year by BrooklynVegan and Impose.

Track listing

Personnel 
Beneath personnel adapted from LP liner notes.

Infant Island

 Daniel Kost – vocals
 Alexander Rudenshiold – guitar, vocals
 Kyle Guerra – bass 
 Austin O’Rourke – drums

Additional instrumentation

 Austin O’Rourke – orchestral arrangements, interludes 
 Winston Givler – noise on "Here We Are," guitar on "One Eyed" 
 Logan Rivera (Gillian Carter) – guest vocals on "Content"

Technical credits

 James Rakestraw – original drums on "Here We Are" and "Death Portrait"
 Matthew Michel (Majority Rule) – engineering, recording, mixing
 Brad Boatright – mastering

Artistic credits

 John Martin – artwork
 Front cover: Sadak in Search of the Waters of Oblivion
 Back cover: The Great Day of His Wrath
 Innersleeve art: The Plains of Heaven
 Austin O'Rourke – art processing, logo design
 Alexander Rudenshiold – art processing, layout, design

References 

2020 albums
Infant Island albums